What a Way to Go is the debut studio album by American country music artist Ray Kennedy. It was released on July 17, 1990 via Atlantic Records. The album includes the singles "What a Way to Go", "Scars" and "I Like the Way It Feels".

Track listing

Chart performance

References

1990 debut albums
Ray Kennedy (country singer) albums
Atlantic Records albums